Gomora may refer to:

 Gomora (kaiju), an Ultraman Monster
 Gomora (moth), a genus of moths
 Gomora (TV series), a South African television series

See also
 Gomorrah (disambiguation)